The name Ading has been used in the Philippines by PAGASA and its predecessor, the Philippine Weather Bureau, for four tropical cyclones in the Northwestern Pacific Ocean:

Typhoon Gilda (1967) (T6737, 39W, Ading), which weakened before making landfall on Taiwan 
Tropical Storm Della (1971) (T7130, 32W, Ading), which formed off the coast of Luzon, and made landfall over Hainan and Vietnam
Tropical Storm Wayne (1979) (T7922, 25W, Ading), which made landfall on Luzon as a tropical depression
Tropical Storm Ruth (1983) (T8321, 22W, Ading), a system that dissipated at sea due to strong wind shear

Pacific typhoon set index articles